Jennifer Carmichael "Jenn" Dodds  (born 1 October 1991) is a Scottish curler. She currently plays mixed doubles with Bruce Mouat, representing Scotland and Great Britain. She is the 2022 Olympic champion in women's curling and the 2022 World champion in mixed doubles curling.

Career
Dodds played second for the Hannah Fleming junior rink that won a silver medal at the 2013 World Junior Curling Championships. While attending Edinburgh College, Dodds played on Fleming's team at the 2013 Winter Universiade, placing fourth.

Dodds left the Fleming rink in 2014, playing third for Lauren Gray for two seasons. The team won the 2015 Dumfries Challenger Series event on the World Curling Tour. In 2016, she returned to the Fleming rink as her third. The team won the 2018 Scottish Women's Curling Championship and defeated the Eve Muirhead Olympic team for the right to represent Scotland at the 2018 World Women's Curling Championship. There, the team missed the playoffs with a 5–7 record. 

For the 2018–19 season, Dodds joined the Muirhead rink as third. At the first leg of the 2018–19 Curling World Cup, Dodds skipped the team due to Muirhead having a hip injury. They finished in sixth with a 2–4 record. She played in her first European Curling Championships at the 2018 European Curling Championships. The team had a disappointing performance, finishing with a 4–5 record and missing the playoffs. At the 2019 Scottish Women's Curling Championships, the team qualified for the final but lost to Sophie Jackson 11–7. In Grand Slam play, the team qualified for the playoffs in two of their three events with their best finish being at the Canadian Open  where they lost in the semifinals.

Team Muirhead began the 2019–20 season by winning the 2019 Cameron's Brewing Oakville Fall Classic. At the 2019 European Curling Championships, the Muirhead rink reached the final where they lost to Sweden's Anna Hasselborg, claiming the silver medal. In early January, they won the Mercure Perth Masters. Team Muirhead claimed the 2020 Scottish Women's Curling Championship by defeating Maggie Wilson 8–3 in the championship game. The team was set to represent Scotland at the 2020 World Women's Curling Championship before the event got cancelled due to the COVID-19 pandemic. In Grand Slam play, they played in three events and qualified in one of them, the 2019 National where they lost in the quarterfinals to Jennifer Jones.

Due to the ongoing pandemic, a limited number of tour events were held during the 2020–21 season. Team Muirhead did play in a series of domestic events put on by the British Curling Association, where they won the January Challenge event and finished runner-up to Team Gina Aitken in the Elite Finals. Dodds and her mixed doubles partner Bruce Mouat also won both mixed doubles events hosted by British Curling, which qualified to represent Scotland at the 2021 World Mixed Doubles Curling Championship. A "curling bubble" was set up in Calgary, Canada in the spring, which hosted a number of events, including the 2021 World Women's Curling Championship and two slams. Team Muirhead competed in both the 2021 Champions Cup and the 2021 Players' Championship, failing to qualify at both events. The next week, the team represented Scotland at the World's, finishing with a disappointing 6–7 record, in eighth place. Right after the World Championship, Dodds travelled back home to Aberdeen, Scotland to compete in the World Mixed Doubles with Mouat. The pair had a strong showing, finishing the round robin with an 8–1 record, earning them a direct bye to the semifinals. They then defeated Canada 7–4 in the semifinal and topped Norway 9–7 to claim the gold medal.

Dodds was appointed Member of the Order of the British Empire (MBE) in the 2022 Birthday Honours for services to curling.

Personal life
Before becoming a full-time curler, Dodds worked as an office assistant.  Her cousin Abigail Brown won the 2012 World Junior championships.

Teams

References

External links

1991 births
Living people
Scottish female curlers
Curlers from Edinburgh
Continental Cup of Curling participants
World mixed doubles curling champions
Curlers at the 2022 Winter Olympics
Olympic curlers of Great Britain
Medalists at the 2022 Winter Olympics
Olympic gold medallists for Great Britain
Olympic medalists in curling
Scottish Olympic medallists
Members of the Order of the British Empire